The following is a list of notable events and releases of the year 1985 in Norwegian music.

Events

March
 29 – The 12th Vossajazz started in Voss, Norway (March 29 – 31).

May
 4 – With the song "La det swinge" ("Let it swing"), Norway's Norwegian pop duo Bobbysocks! won the Eurovision Song Contest 1985.
 22 – 13th Nattjazz started in Bergen, Norway (May 22 – June 5).

June
 30 – The 16th Kalvøyafestivalen started at Kalvøya near by Oslo.

September
 16 – The Pop band A-ha released a new version of their single Take On Me, which debuted last year, featuring a cartoon music video of a motor race, and within weeks it is a number one hit worldwide in countries including the United Kingdom and the United States of America.

Albums released

Unknown date

G
 Jan Garbarek
 Song For Everyone (ECM Records), with L. Shankar, Zakir Hussain, and Trilok Gurtu

K
 Karin Krog
 Some Other Spring, Blues And Ballads (Bluebell Records), with Dexter Gordon

N
 Lillebjørn Nilsen
 Hilsen Nilsen (Grappa Music)

R
 Terje Rypdal
 Chaser (ECM Records)

S
 Thorgeir Stubø
 Everything We Love (Hot Club Records), with Doug Raney
 Flight (Hot Club Records)

Deaths

 May
 29 – Christian Hartmann, composer (born 1910).
 
 August
 5 – Olav Kielland, composer and orchestra conductor (born 1901).

 November
 18 – Stephan Henrik Barratt-Due, violinist and music teacher (born 1919).

Births

 January
 2 
 André Roligheten, jazz saxophonist and composer.
 Marius Neset, jazz saxophonist and composer.
 10
 Gabrielle Leithaug, Electropop singer and songwriter.
 29 – Jon Rune Strøm, jazz upright bassist, and bass guitarist.

 February
 19 – Kristoffer Lo, jazz tubist, flugabonist, guitarist and composer.
 25 – Anine Stang, singer and songwriter.

 March
 5 – Eyolf Dale, jazz pianist and composer.
 15 – Trygve Wiese, pop singer.

 April
 12 – Siri Nilsen, singer, songwriter and voice actress.

 May
 13 – Alexander Rybak, singer, songwriter, violinist, pianist, and actor.
 14 – Tore Sandbakken, jazz drummer and composer.

 June
 20 – Ellen Brekken, jazz upright bassist, bass guitarist and tubist.

 July
 2 – Gunnhild Sundli, actor and singer (Gåte).
 6 – Maria Arredondo, pop singer.
 8 – Vivian Sørmeland, pop singer.

 August
 1 – Caroline "Dina" Lillian Kongerud, pop artist.
 15 – Carina Dahl, pop singer and songwriter.
 22 – Kim Johannesen, jazz guitarist and improviser.

 October
 11 – Margaret Berger, singer, songwriter, music director, and DJ.
 15 – Øystein Skar, jazz pianist and composer.

 December
 4 – Linni Meister, pop singer.
 19 – Ine Hoem, jazz singer.

 Unknown date
 Catharina Chen, classical violinist.
 Per Arne Ferner, jazz guitarist.

See also
 1985 in Norway
 Music of Norway
 Norway in the Eurovision Song Contest 1985

References

 
Norwegian music
Norwegian
Music
1980s in Norwegian music